HD 269810 is a blue giant star in the Large Magellanic Cloud. It is one of the most massive and most luminous stars known, and one of only a handful of stars with the spectral type O2.

Name
The star's name, HD 269810, comes from the Henry Draper Catalogue. The serial number 269810 indicates it was published in the extension of the catalogue and is formally referred to as HDE 269810.

Details
The luminosity class of III indicates a star somewhat evolved and expanded compared to the zero-age main sequence. The spectral peculiarity code (f*) indicates strong NIII emission lines, even stronger NNIV emission, and weak HeNII emission.

Evolution
Stars as massive as HD 269810 with metallicity typical of the Large Magellanic Cloud will maintain near-homogeneous chemical structure due to strong convection and rotational mixing. This produces strong helium and nitrogen surface abundance enhancement even during core hydrogen burning. Their rotation rates will also decrease significantly due to mass loss and envelope inflation, so that gamma-ray bursts are unlikely when this type of star reaches core collapse. They are expected to develop directly into Wolf–Rayet stars, passing through WN, WC, and WO stages before exploding as a type Ic supernova and leaving behind a black hole. The total lifetime would be around 2 million years, showing an O-type spectrum for most of that time before a shorter period with a WR spectrum.

References

External links
Heaviest Known Star Observed from Space

Stars in the Large Magellanic Cloud
Dorado (constellation)
Emission-line stars
269810
Large Magellanic Cloud
Extragalactic stars
O-type giants
J05351389-6733275